Let Me Tickle Your Fancy is the ninth studio album by Jermaine Jackson, released in 1982.  It was his final album for Motown Records. It reached No. 46 on the Billboard Top LPs chart and No. 9 on the Top R&B LPs chart. The title track peaked at No. 5 on the soul singles chart.

Track listing

Personnel 
 Jermaine Jackson – lead vocals, backing vocals, keyboards, synthesizers, synth bass, bass guitar, drums, percussion, congas
 Ronnie Foster – keyboards
 Denzil Miller – keyboards, synth bass
 Paul Jackson, Jr. – guitars, bass guitar 
 Nathan East – bass guitar 
 Tal Hawkins – bass guitar 
 Ollie E. Brown – drums
 James Gadson – drums
 Jonathan Moffett – drums
 Arnold Ramsey – drums
 Karen Jackson – percussion 
 Randy Jackson – percussion
 Godfrey Watson – percussion
 Monica Pege – additional backing vocals (1)
 Spud and Pud Devo – additional backing vocals (1)
 Adonis Hampton – additional backing vocals
 Marti McCall – additional backing vocals
 Gonzales Ozen – additional backing vocals
 Stephanie Spruill – additional backing vocals

Arrangements
 Jermaine Jackson – rhythm arrangements (1-5, 6, 7, 9, 10), horn arrangements (2, 6, 7, 8)
 Paul Jackson, Jr. – rhythm arrangements (2, 3)
 Benjamin Wright – horn arrangements (2)
 Jerry Hey – horn arrangements (3, 6, 7)
 Denzil Miller – rhythm arrangements (4, 5, 6)
 Gene Page – string arrangements (4, 5)
 John McClain – rhythm arrangements (8), horn arrangements (8)
 George Del Barrio – string arrangements (10)

Production 
 Berry Gordy – producer, executive producer 
 Jermaine Jackson – producer 
 Hazel Jackson – executive producer 
 Michael Schuman – recording, mixing 
 Mick Guzauski – assistant engineer 
 Bob Harlan – assistant engineer 
 Robin Laine – assistant engineer 
 Keith Seppanen – assistant engineer 
 John Matousek – mastering 
 Johnny Lee – art direction, design 
 Ron Slenzak – photography

Studios
 Recorded at Yamaha Research and Development Studio (Glendale, California).
 Mixed at The Village Recorder (Los Angeles, California).
 Mastered at Hitsville U.S.A. (Los Angeles, California).

References

External links
 Jermaine Jackson-Let Me Tickle Your Fancy at Discogs

1982 albums
Jermaine Jackson albums
Albums arranged by Gene Page
Albums produced by Berry Gordy
Motown albums